Francis Aldrich,  D.D. was an academic in the late sixteenth and early seventeenth centuries.

Aldrich was educated at Clare Hall, Cambridge. He was one of the original Fellows of Sidney Sussex College, Cambridge and its Master from April 1608 until his death on 27 December 1609.

Notes

1609 deaths
Masters of Sidney Sussex College, Cambridge
Fellows of Sidney Sussex College, Cambridge
Alumni of Clare College, Cambridge